Francesca Schiavone was the defending champion, but chose not to compete.
Roberta Vinci reached her third final in a row here and won against Lucie Hradecká, 4–6, 6–2, 6–2.

Seeds

Qualifying

Draw

Finals

Top half

Bottom half

References
Main Draw

Singles 2011